Daiya-monde is the first album by Hitomi Yaida released on 25 October 2000. The singles from this album were "B'coz I Love You" and "My Sweet Darlin'". The album also contains the mix version of "How?" & "I like" released from the indie record label only in the Kansai area.

The album title is a word coined by Yaida. "Daiya" reads "Yaida" in reversed order in Japanese, and
"monde" means "the world" in French. That is, the title shows "Yaiko World". Moreover, it is an equivoque with "Diamond" of Diamond Head which produces her.

Track listing

Notes and references 

2000 albums
Hitomi Yaida albums